Drežnica may refer to:

 Drežnica, Croatia, a village near Ogulin, Croatia
 Drežnica, Serbia, a village near Bujanovac, Serbia
 Drežnica, Slovenia, a village near Kobarid, Slovenia
 Donja Drežnica, a village near Mostar, Bosnia and Herzegovina
 Gornja Drežnica, a village near Mostar, Bosnia and Herzegovina
 Drežnica, one of the largest karst vales in Bosnia and Herzegovina and the Balkans, and the river Drežanka (sometimes Drežnica), right tributary of the Neretva,